The Piranha Plant,  known as  in Japan, is a fictional plant species from Nintendo's Mario franchise media. It usually appears as a leafy green stalk topped with a white-spotted red or green globe, with a maw lined with sharp teeth reminiscent of piranhas. Piranha Plants are typically portrayed as tethered enemies which emerge from green-coloured "warp pipes" scattered throughout the game world that player characters must evade or overcome, though multiple subspecies with different abilities as well as physical attributes have appeared in various titles: some may simply stick up from the ground, and in some cases even walk freely on its own roots.

Regarded as one of the most iconic recurring elements or motifs of Mario franchise media, the Piranha Plant has appeared in nearly every video game title in the franchise since 1985's Super Mario Bros., as well as numerous appearances outside of it. Most notably, it has been adapted as a fully mobile playable character, which is made available through downloadable content (DLC) for the 2018 crossover fighting game Super Smash Bros. Ultimate, developed by Bandai Namco Studios and Sora Ltd. This iteration of the character has been met with a generally positive reception.

Development
First appearing in 1985's Super Mario Bros., Piranha Plants are originally depicted as stationary carnivorous plants confined to green warp pipes bristling out of the game world, lying in wait for prey to come within range like the real-world Venus Flytrap. Within the context of video game design, the Piranha Plant is a low-risk hazard that is tied to a single location within the game world akin to a trap. The purpose behind its design is to create platforms which are temporarily safe and sometimes dangerous, occupying a role between an environmental challenge and an enemy challenge for the player character.

The Piranha Plant's maw, pointed upwards and full of sharp teeth, serves as an important visual cue for the player not to let their character touch it from above, which shapes the player's expectations for the remainder of the game as part of its ongoing visual vocabulary. Later titles subvert the notion that player characters cannot come into physical contact with a Piranha Plant without being harmed: in Super Mario 64 for example, players could safely dispatch a Piranha Plant by having Mario execute a stomp attack on it while airborne. In Super Mario 3D World, players could pick up Piranha Plants which grow on pots by holding the run button, which allows them to be weaponized against opponents.

Super Smash Bros. Ultimate director Masahiro Sakurai chose the Piranha Plant as a post-release addition because he considered it to be a very well known character, and felt that making it a complimentary early purchase bonus as part of a limited-time offer would be an effective promotional effort. While Sakurai acknowledged that the Piranha Plant is an example of a playable character that lies outside of players' typical expectations, he emphasized that having a "good balance" is prioritized over the element of surprise when it comes to the planning of the game's roster.

Appearances

Mario franchise
The Piranha Plant first appears in the "World 1-2" level of the 1985 video game Super Mario Bros. Green in colouration, its method of hunting and feeding appears to involve raising its head into the air and biting anything that crosses its path at that exact moment. Red-coloured versions of Piranha Plants appear in Super Mario Bros.: The Lost Levels, originally the Japanese version of Super Mario Bros. 2. Reflecting the elevated difficulty of Lost Levels, it has a faster movement pattern compared to the original green version, and is bold enough to emerge from a warp pipe even when the player character is standing right next to it. Super Mario Bros. 3 introduced the Venus Fire Trap, a Piranha Plant variant which could spit fireballs as a ranged attack. In a break with visual conventions from earlier games, its head is turned to the side and aimed at the player character, while the top of its head is a smooth and round surface. Another type of Piranha Plant that appears in Super Mario Bros. 3 is the Ptooie, a walking variant that exhales air to lift a spiked ball into the air to hinder the player character's progress.

Piranha Plants continued to appear in subsequent Mario franchise titles, often with some changes in their presentation as well as combat design. Larger specimens would typically require multiple attacks before they are fully dispatched. New Super Mario Bros. for the Nintendo DS established a consistent visual look for the basic Piranha Plant. In New Super Mario Bros. U, Piranha Plants rarely retreat into pipes; they may appear on moving platforms and would constantly make gnashing movements. Super Mario Sunshine introduces a unique Piranha Plant character named Petey Piranha, which is massive in size. Super Mario Galaxy introduces a similar advanced variant named Dino Piranha. In Super Mario Odyssey, Piranha Plants could be captured by Mario if the player throws Cappy, his hat, at the plant's head.

The Piranha Plant's other appearances within the extended Mario franchise include the 1989 television series; the spin-off Mario Kart series, particularly in Mario Kart 8 where they serve as environmental hazards as well as power-up items; Mario Tennis Aces; and in various Mario Party minigames.

Other appearances
The Piranha Plant has made numerous appearances outside of Mario franchise media. Notable examples include Tetris Attack; The Legend of Zelda: Link's Awakening and its 2019 remake; Lego City Undercover; and in Sonic Lost World as DLC content.

The Piranha Plant is the first post-release playable character introduced via DLC for 2018's Super Smash Bros. Ultimate. It was released in January 2019 and made available for free to those who purchased and registered the game with a My Nintendo account before the end of that month, after which it is made available as a standalone purchase. Ultimate also marks the first instance of the Piranha Plant as a playable character until its introduction to Dr. Mario World.

Promotion and merchandise
Piranha Plants are presented as prominent attractions in the Super Nintendo World themed area at Universal Studios theme parks. A mini-game called Piranha Plant Nap Mishap has up to four participating players repeatedly slapping the tops of 12 oversized ringing alarm clocks in order to silence them before they fully "awaken" a massive Piranha Plant that looms overhead.

A variety of merchandise depicting Piranha Plant have been produced. Examples includes slippers; a warp pipe toy;
a Super Mario-branded figurine; and a limited bottle design released by Coca Cola to celebrate the one-year anniversary of the grand opening of Super Nintendo World in Osaka. Multiple Lego sets featuring the Piranha Plant as centerpieces have been released as of the 2020s. An Amiibo figurine depicting the Piranha Plant was released in February 2019 following its appearance as a playable character in Smash Ultimate. Epoch Games produced a board game centered around the character called Super Mario Piranha Plant Escape: its gameplay revolves around the rolling of dice and the advancement of figurines that represent Mario and Luigi while players attempt to avoid an impending attack from the Piranha Plant centerpiece.

Reception 

Several media outlets have highlighted the Piranha Plant's status as an iconic element of the Mario franchise. The Piranha Plant has appeared in numerous "top" character lists compiled by video game publications, such as IGN, 1UP.com, and GameDaily. Merchandise themed after the Piranha Plant, particularly the Lego sets, have received generally positive reviews.

The revelation of the Piranha Plant as a playable character for Smash Ultimate have drawn an enthusiastic response from video game publications, as well as players. Although some players have encountered technical issues with unlocking the character or experienced data corruption of their save files following the DLC's installation, overall post-release response from both casual and professional players to the Piranha Plant's addition to the roster of Ultimate was generally positive.

IGN lauded the gameplay mechanics for Piranha Plant in their initial impression of the DLC content shortly after its launch. In his in-depth review of the DLC content, Justin Berube from Nintendo World Report said he originally had reservations about Piranha Plant taking up a roster spot at the expense of a more prominent character like Waluigi, but admitted that its playstyle grew on him. After describing each of the character's abilities in detail, Berube concluded that its unique moveset seem to allow for some creative utility, in addition to providing fun and unique gameplay. Writing for Kotaku, Cecilia D'Anastasio summarized the gameplay for Smash Ultimate Piranha Plant to be "sluggish but fun", faulting its lack of speed and low mobility while lauding its "toolkit" for offering a range of unusual moves that could interlock to form interesting combos at the player's discretion, which enables a skilled player to effectively control space on a stage and defend against aerial enemies.

Unlike his colleague's previously positive reaction towards Piranha Plant's Smash Ultimate debut, Gavin Lane from Nintendo Life was unimpressed with the announcement of the Piranha Plant for Dr. Mario World in December 2020, and mocked Nintendo for "scraping the barrel".

References 

Fictional monsters
Plant characters
Super Smash Bros. fighters
Mario (franchise) enemies
Video game characters introduced in 1985
Video game species and races